Jef Neve (born 8 March 1977) is a Belgian jazz and classical music pianist and composer.

Life and career
Neve was born in Turnhout, Belgium. By the age of 14 he was composing music and playing in bands. He studied jazz and classical music at the Lemmensinstituut in Leuven and graduated in 2000.

Neve wrote the soundtrack for Felix Van Groeningen's Dagen Zonder Lief. He also composed for the VRT series In Vlaamse Velden (In Flanders Fields). The pianist played on Ludovic Bource's soundtrack for The Artist.

The Guardian'''s reviewer of Neve's 2008 release Soul in a Picture commented that the pianist's playing contained "a very personal language, one which draws freely on classical music and – aided and abetted by Piet Verbist (bass) and Teun Verbruggen (drums) – has the impetus of jazz and rock".
Neve appeared on José James' 2010 album For All We Know''.

Discography
An asterisk (*) indicates that the year is that of release.

As leader/co-leader

As sideman

References

1977 births
Neve, Jef
Belgian jazz pianists
21st-century pianists